Hotel del Luna is a 2019 South Korean television series, starring Lee Ji-eun and Yeo Jin-goo as the owner and manager, respectively, of the eponymous hotel that caters only to ghosts. Produced by GT:st, written by the Hong sisters and directed by Oh Choong-hwan, it aired on tvN from July 13 to September 1, 2019.

It was the most viewed tvN drama of 2019 and is one of the highest-rated Korean dramas in cable television history.

Synopsis 
"Hotel del Luna" (previously known as "Guest House of the Moon") is not like any other hotel. A supernatural place, the hotel is not visible in its true form during the daytime and humans can only come across the hotel under special circumstances. Its staff and clients are all ghosts coming to terms with unfinished business in their former lives before they pass on to the afterlife and cycle of reincarnation; the staff, in particular, have been there for decades or centuries as they have not settled their grudges. The exception to this is the hotel's general manager, which has been filled by a succession of human "passersby" since they need to interact normally with the real world in certain instances, like paying bills or fulfilling ghosts' requests with still-living relatives/friends.

Jang Man-wol (Lee Ji-eun) is the owner of this hotel, which is located in Myeong-dong, Seoul. Due to a huge sin committed more than a millennium ago, the hotel catering to the dead has been bound to her soul.

As a result of manipulation by the deity Mago (Seo Yi-sook), Jang Man-wol meets Gu Chan-sung's father (Oh Ji-ho) and makes a deal: in exchange for his life, his son will work for her 20 years later.

Desperate to save his son, the father takes Gu Chan-sung (Yeo Jin-goo) abroad. The young man grows up to be a sincere, level-headed perfectionist with a soft heart. He comes back to South Korea after his father's death, 21 years later to be an assistant manager at a multi-national hotel corporation, only to face Jang Man-wol, after which he ends up fulfilling the agreement and becomes the manager of Hotel del Luna.

Through Gu Chan-sung, the mysteries and the secrets behind the hotel and its owner are revealed.

Cast and characters

Main

 Lee Ji-eun as Jang Man-wol
 Kim Gyu-ri as young Man-wol
 The moody owner of Hotel del Luna (Guest House of the Moon). She was condemned to this fate in order to atone for the sins she committed 1,300 years ago. Alternating between being aloof and bad-tempered, she is known for her love of extravagant things, particularly luxurious outfits, fast cars, and expensive champagne.
 Yeo Jin-goo as Gu Chan-sung
 Kim Kang-hoon as young Chan-sung
 The new general manager of Hotel del Luna. He is a Harvard MBA graduate hired as an assistant manager at one of Korea's top hotels. However, due to a deal his father made with Jang Man-wol twenty-one years earlier, Chan-sung is forced to become the general manager of Hotel del Luna. Being stoic and rational puts him at odds with Man-wol, particularly curbing her spendthrift and extortionist tendencies.

Supporting

At the Hotel del Luna
 Jung Dong-hwan as Noh Joon-suk
 The hotel's general manager for 30 years and Chan-sung's predecessor. He considers Man-wol as a sister, daughter and friend.
 Shin Jung-geun as Kim Seon-bi (formerly Kim Shi-ik)
 The longest employee of the hotel and the Sky Bar's bartender. Before his death, he was a Joseon Dynasty scholar.
 Bae Hae-sun as Choi Seo-hee
 The housekeeper and room service provider with an extrovert personality. She lived during the Joseon era as a nobleman's wife.
 Pyo Ji-hoon as Ji Hyun-joong
 The hotel receptionist. He is nice and polite but does not like his job. He was a student who died at the height of the Korean War.
 Kang Mi-na as spirit of Jung Soo-jung / Kim Yoo-na
 A rich and arrogant student, whose body ends up being inhabited by the spirit of Jung Soo-jung, a schoolmate whom Yoo-na bullied and accidentally killed. When Yoo-na's spirit is destroyed, Soo-jung decides to remain inside Yoo-na's body and assume her identity.

People around Jang Man-wol
 Lee Do-hyun as Go Chung-myung
 A Later Silla royal guard captain who becomes a friend of Man-wol and Yeon-woo.
 Lee Tae-sun as Yeon-woo / Officer Park Young-soo
 The co-leader of the bandits and Man-wol's foster brother. He is reincarnated as police detective Park Young-soo.

People around Gu Chan-sung
 Cho Hyun-chul as Sanchez
 Chan-sung's best friend since they were studying at Harvard. He is the son of a wealthy pizza franchise operator, running the restaurant in Seoul. He opens up his house to Chan-sung and Lee Mi-ra.
 Park Yoo-na as Princess Song-hwa / Lee Mi-ra
 A Later Silla princess who was evil. After spending several centuries atoning for her sins, she is reincarnated as Lee Mi-ra, a doctor with a good personality and Chan-sung's ex-girlfriend from his university days.
 Lee David as Seol Ji-won
 A rich young man and Chan-sung's schoolmate at Harvard. He holds a grudge against both Chan-sung and Sanchez. He is later revealed to be a psychopathic serial killer who murdered at least seven people, in which all of their souls became guests of Hotel Del Luna.

Other characters 
 Seo Yi-sook as Mago
 A goddess who controls the life and death of people passing through the hotel and appears in many forms.
 Kang Hong-seok as Grim Reaper
 A spirit who guides the souls staying at the hotel to the afterlife and captures wandering evil spirits.
 Kwon Han-sol as Kyung-ah
 Song Duk-ho as Oh Tae-seok	
 He is a soldier who runs away from war when the war breaks out so he could take care of his younger sister.

Special appearances
 Oh Ji-ho as Chan-sung's father (Ep. 1 & 16)
 Kim Won-hae as the mayor (Ep. 1)
 Lee Chae-kyung as hotel CEO (Ep. 1–2 & 10)
 Nam Kyoung-eub as Chairman Wang (Ep. 2, 9 & 10)
 Lee Joon-gi as priest (Ep. 3)
 Lee Si-eon as astronaut (Ep. 3)
 Jo Hyun-sik as hotel guest (Ep. 3)
 Hong Kyung as baker (Ep. 4)
 Kim Mi-eun as bride Lee Soo-min (Ep. 5)
 Lee Yi-kyung as actor Yu Oh (Ep. 6)
 Pyo Ye-jin as actress (Ep. 6)
 Kim Jun-hyun as himself (Ep. 6)
 Park Jin-joo as Gyeong-ah (Ep. 8)
 Nam Da-reum as Spirit of the Well (Ep. 9–10)
 Sulli as Jung Ji-eun (Ep. 10)
 Choi Yoo-song as spirit of Chan-sung's mother (Ep. 10)
 Seo Eun-soo as Veronica (Ep. 11)
 Hwang Young-hee as Hwang Moon-sook (Ep. 11)
 Lee Seung-joon as doctor (Ep. 12)
 So Hee-jung as doctor's wife (Ep. 12)
 Kim Seung-han as doctor's son (Ep. 12)
 Lee Min-young as ghost (Ep. 13)
 Kim Soo-hyun as new owner of the Guest House of the Moon, renaming it Hotel Blue Moon (Ep. 16)

Original soundtrack

Part 1

Part 2

Part 3

Part 4

Part 5

Part 6

Part 7

Part 8

Part 9

Part 10

Part 11

Part 12

Part 13

Special soundtrack

Chart performance

Viewership
This series aired on tvN, a cable channel/pay TV which normally has a relatively smaller audience compared to free-to-air TV/public broadcasters (KBS, SBS, MBC and EBS). It was the most viewed tvN drama of 2019, and is currently the sixteenth highest-rated Korean drama in cable television history.

Awards and nominations

Adaptations

US remake
On June 24, 2020, Studio Dragon announced that it would co-produce an American remake of Hotel del Luna with Skydance. Alison Schapker will be in charge of developing and producing the series. She will be working with Miky Lee, Jinnie Choi and Hyun Park of Studio Dragon, and David Ellison, Dana Goldberg and Bill Bost of Skydance Television. So far, no channel has picked up the idea of a US remake.

Korean musical
On January 27, 2021, the theater company Showplay announced that Hotel del Luna was adapted into a stage musical that premiered in 2022.

References

External links
  
 Hotel del Luna at Studio Dragon 
 Hotel del Luna at GTist 
 
 
 

Korean-language television shows
2019 South Korean television series debuts
2019 South Korean television series endings
TVN (South Korean TV channel) television dramas
South Korean fantasy television series
Television shows written by the Hong sisters
Television series by Studio Dragon
Television series about ghosts
Television series set in 2019
Television series set in hotels
Television shows set in Seoul